The common bleak (Alburnus alburnus) is a small freshwater coarse fish of the cyprinid family.

Description 

The body of the bleak is elongated and flat. The head is pointed and the relatively small mouth is turned upwards. The anal fin is long and has 18-23 fin rays. The lateral line is complete. The bleak has a shiny silvery colour, and the fins are pointed and colourless. Its maximum length is about 25 cm (10 in).

In Europe, the bleak can easily be confused with many other species. In England, young common bream and silver bream can be confused with young bleak, though the pointed, upward-turned mouth of the bleak is already distinctive at young stages. Young roach and ruffe have wider bodies and  short anal fins.

Occurrence
The bleak occurs in Europe and Western Asia: north of the Caucasus, Pyrenees, and Alps, and eastward toward the Volga basin in northern Iran and north-western Turkey. It is absent from Iberian and Apennine peninsulas, from the rivers of Adriatic watershed on the Balkans and most of British Isles except southeast England. It is  locally introduced in Spain, Portugal, and Italy, though.

Ecology
The bleak lives in great schools and feeds upon small molluscs, insects that fall in the water, insect larvae, worms, small shellfish, and plant detritus. It is found in streams and lakes. The bleak prefers open waters and is found in large numbers where  an inflow of food from pumping stations or behind weirs occurs.

Spawning 
The bleak spawns near the shore in shallow waters. Some are found in deep water. The substrate is not important.

Importance 
The bleak is an important food source for predatory fish. It is more sensitive to pollution than other cyprinids, which might explain the decline in north-western Europe.

Uses 
Bleak are used as bait for sport-fishing for larger fish. In 1656 in Paris, a Mr. Jaquin extracted from the scales of the common bleak, so-called essence Orientale or "pearl essence", (used in making artificial pearls), which is crystalline guanine.

References 

Alburnus
Freshwater fish of Europe
Fish of Europe
Fish described in 1758
Taxa named by Carl Linnaeus